Nyi Nyi Htwe (also known as Ko Ko Lay; born 25 March 1970) is a Burmese politician who currently serves as an Amyotha Hluttaw MP for Sagaing Region No. 11 constituency. He is a member of the National League for Democracy.

Early life and career
Nyi Nyi Htet was born on 25 March 1970 in Paungbyin l, Myanmar. In 1988, he joined the NLD Party in Paungbyin Township. He had served as a member of the NLD Party Youth, as associate treasurer of Homalin Township NLD reorganization in 2002 from 2003. In 2012, he is a member of Conference Commission at Hkhamti District and served as the center Conference representative.

Political career
He is a member of the National League for Democracy. In the 2015 Myanmar general election, he was elected as an Amyotha Hluttaw member of parliament and elected representative from Sagaing Region No. 11 parliamentary constituency.

References

National League for Democracy politicians
1970 births
Living people
People from Sagaing Region
Sagaing Township